Inga Sempé (born 1968) is a French designer and constructor of technical items, who designs furniture, lamps and other design objects for manufacturers like Ligne Roset, Alessi und Baccarat. She was awarded the Red Dot Design Award in 2007.

Life 
Inga Sempé was born in 1968 as daughter of Mette Ivers, a Danish graphic artist and painter and the well-known French graphic artist Jean-Jacques Sempé. She studied at the Ecole Nationale Superieure de Création Industrielle (ENSCI) in Paris and passed her final exams there in 1993. She is married to the designer Ronan Bouroullec and has two children. Inga Sempé lives and works in Paris.

Career 
In 1994 she designed for the Australian designer Marc Newson, in 1997–1999 for the French designer Andrée Putman. From 2000 she worked for the Italian design companies Cappellini and Edra and at the same time founded her own company in Paris. She aims for sustainable, simple, but not minimalist objects.

For her, function is important, and the material has to support it. "Sempé's lamps can be extended like accordions, the size of her suitcase prototype for the manufacturer Via, which can replace any hotel wardrobe, can be changed." For Italian, French and Scandinavian design companies she projects furniture and pictures as well as design objects, such as for Alessi, Ligne Roset, Baccarat, Tectona, HAY, LucePlan, Moustache and the American manufacturer Artecnica.

Works 
Many of her lamps have lampshades which appear like fans and allow a variety of light and shade impressions. The pendant luminaire Plissé produced by Luceplan can be unfolded like an accordion, as the material is pleated. In 2009 the lamp manufacturer Moustache launched the series of Vapeur pendants and table lamps with their characteristic lampshades made out of densely folded Tyvek-fleece. This thin, papery material is either white or printed with very thin lines in delicate colours.

The Swedish lamp manufacturer Wästberg offers a clip lamp by Inga Sempé which can also stand on the table or hang from the wall.

Exhibitions 
In 2003 the Musée des Arts Décoratifs in Paris dedicated an exhibition to Inga Sempé.

Awards 
In 2000/2001 she got a scholarship for the Villa Medici, an institution of the Académie de France à Rome.
In 2003 she received the 8000-Euro-Major Design Award of the City of Paris, in 2007 the Red Dot Design Award for her upholstered furniture Moël. In 2012 she was guest of honor of the Stockholm furniture fair Stockholm Furniture Fair & Northern Light Fair.

References 
 Florian Siebeck talking with Inga Sempé: Frankreich ist ein furchtbares Land für Designer, Frankfurter Allgemeine Zeitung, 4 August 2015, retrieved 15 October 2015.
 S. A.: Designer des Monats: Inga Sempé. Inga Sempé glaubt nicht an Inspiration. Dennoch zählt die 39-Jährige zu den inspiriertesten Designerinnen unserer Zeit., Elle, 9 September 2008, retrieved 15 October 2015.

External links 
 Website of Inga Sempé

Notes 

French industrial designers
Product designers
Living people
1968 births
Artists from Paris
French people of Danish descent